Zaytsevo is a rural locality (a village) in Korobitsynskoye Rural Settlement, Syamzhensky District, Vologda Oblast, Russia. The population was 24 as of 2002.

Geography 
Zaytsevo is located 42 km southeast of Syamzha (the district's administrative centre) by road. Pestino is the nearest rural locality.

References 

Rural localities in Syamzhensky District